The following lists the films composed by Ilaiyaraaja in the 2000s.

Ilaiyaraaja 2000

Ilaiyaraaja 2001

Ilaiyaraaja 2002

Ilaiyaraaja 2003

Ilaiyaraaja 2004

Ilaiyaraaja 2005

Ilaiyaraaja 2006

Ilaiyaraaja 2007

Ilaiyaraaja 2008

Ilaiyaraaja 2009

Decade-wise statistics

References

External links
 
 Raaja.com: The official Internet website of Ilaiyaraaja
 Collection of Ilayaraja Songs, Videos, Images and BGM

Indian songs
Discographies
Discographies of Indian artists